Cilician Arabic, Cilicia-Antioch Arabic, Çukurova Arabic, or Çukurovan is a dialect of Arabic spoken in Turkey. It is a variety of North Levantine Arabic spoken by Alawi communities in the geo-cultural area of Cilicia, the coastal region of the Turkish Eastern Mediterranean from Hatay to Mersin and Adana.

Speakers 
Levantine Arabic speakers in Turkey come from four different religious groups: Sunni Muslim, Alawites, Christian (Greek Orthodox and Catholic), and Jewish. It is difficult to know the number of Arabic speakers. Due to pressures against minority languages, younger generations of the Arabic-speaking communities increasingly use Turkish as their mother tongue. In 1971, 36% of the population in Hatay was Arabic-speaking. In 1996, Grimes estimated 500,000 speakers of North Levantine Arabic in Turkey.

In 2011, according to Procházka there were 70,000 Çukurova Arabic speakers in the Adana and Mersin provinces and people under 30 years old had completely switched to Turkish. In 2011, Werner estimated 200,000 Antiochia Arabic speakers in Hatay. According to Ethnologue, Levantine Arabic is "Threatened" in Turkey. Çukurova Arabic is in danger of becoming extinct in a few decades.

References

Arabic language
Languages of Turkey